Three ships of the British Royal Navy have been named HMS Ladybird, after the ladybird family of beetles (Coccinellidae).

 The first  was an  launched in 1916 and sunk off Tobruk in 1941.
 The second  was a base ship purchased in 1950 and returned to the original owner in 1953.
 The third  is a tender launched in 1970.

References 
 

Royal Navy ship names